Rachel Zoffness is an American pain psychologist and author. She is an assistant clinical professor at the UCSF School of Medicine and lectures at Stanford University. Zoffness is the author of The Pain Management Workbook and The Chronic Pain and Illness Workbook for Teens.

Education
Zoffness attended Brown University, where she earned a Bachelor of Arts in Human Biology: Brain and Behavior in 1998. She earned a Master of Arts in Psychology and Education from Teachers College, Columbia University in 2001 and a Master of Science in Clinical Psychology at San Diego State University in 2009. She completed her doctorate in clinical psychology at the University of California, San Diego in 2011.

References 

Year of birth missing (living people)
21st-century American psychologists
Brown University alumni
Teachers College, Columbia University alumni
San Diego State University alumni
University of California, San Diego alumni
Living people